Proton capture is a nuclear reaction in which an atomic nucleus and one or more protons collide and merge to form a heavier nucleus.

Since protons have positive electric charge, they are repelled electrostatically by the positively charged nucleus. Therefore, it is more difficult for protons to enter the nucleus compared to neutrally charged neutrons.

Proton capture plays an important role in the cosmic nucleosynthesis of proton rich isotopes. In stars it can proceed in two ways: as a rapid (rp-process) or a slow process (p-process).

See also
p-nuclei
Proton emission
List of particles
Neutron capture
Radioactive decay
Rays: α — β — γ — δ

References

External links

Nuclear physics
Capture

This process makes lithium in stars to get converted into helium in main-sequence stars.